An Eskimo yo-yo or Alaska yo-yo is a traditional two-balled skill toy played and performed by the Eskimo-speaking Alaska Natives, such as Inupiat, Siberian Yupik, and Yup'ik. It resembles fur-covered bolas and yo-yo. It is regarded as one of the most simple, yet most complex, cultural artifacts/toys in the world. The Eskimo yo-yo involves simultaneously swinging two sealskin balls suspended on caribou sinew strings in opposite directions with one hand. It is popular with Alaskans and tourists alike. This traditional toy is two unequal lengths of twine, joined together, with hand-made leather objects (balls, bells, hearts) at the ends of the twine.

The object of the Eskimo yo-yo is to make the balls circle in opposite directions at the same time. Each cord is a different length to allow the balls to pass without striking one another, and the balls are powered by centripetal force (as they rise the performer pumps down, while they fall the performer pumps up). This basic trick may be referred to as the "Eskimo orbit", and the orbit may be performed vertically, horizontally, or (horizontally) above one's head. Other tricks or patterns include atypical beginnings and wrapping and/or bouncing the strings around a part of one's body and then continuing with the orbit.  A three-ball version of the Eskimo yo-yo also exists, and this requires all three balls to be moving at the same time.

The objects at the end of the string are made in a variety of shapes, ranging from seals, ptarmigan feet and dolls, to miniature mukluks and simple balls. The handle may be wood, bone, or ivory, as well as baleen. Many are plainly decorated; others display elaborate decorations, fine beadwork, and intricate details. The Eskimo yo-yo is bola, toy, and art form all rolled into one. One of their most popular forms of the Alaska Native art are yo-yos. Also, this is a popular tourist art found in gift shops across Alaska. Some shops carry only Native-made pieces, while others, according to Alysa Klistoff, carry imitation pieces made in China. See: Indian Arts and Crafts Act of 1990. Much like the spinning top (e.g. Maxwell's top), the yo-yo may also be used to demonstrate visual properties such as optical rotation and circular dichroism.

Though the early history of the Eskimo yo-yo is not recorded, Eskimos maintain that this game originated as an important and widely used hunting tool made simply with sinew and bones, the bola. It possibly evolved on St. Lawrence Island from the similarly constructed sinew and rock bolas used in bird hunting.



See also

 Astrojax
 Blanket toss
 Clackers
 Eskimo bowline
 Euler top
 Gyroscope
 Meteor (juggling)
 Poi (performance art)
 Whirly tube

Explanatory notes

References

Further reading
 Kiana, Chris (1986). Eskimo Yo Yo Tricks: 50 Tricks Instructional Book with Eskimo Customs & Legends Paperback. H&K. ASIN: B00P0GWUDE.
 Kiana, Chris (1997).  Alaska Eskimo Yo-Yo. VHS. Takotna Video, Alaska Eskimo Yo-Yo Company Inc. ASIN: B000UFSP8E.
 Kiana, Chris (2009). Chris Kiana's Educational Eskimo Yo-yo. DVD. Takotna Video, Alaska Eskimo Yo-Yo Company Inc.

External links 
 
 
 

Inupiat culture
Rotation
Traditional toys
Yo-yos
Yupik culture